K-156 is a  west–east state highway in the U.S. state of Kansas. K-156's western terminus is at U.S. Route 50 Business (US-50 Bus.) and US-83 Bus. in Garden City and the eastern terminus is at Interstate 70 (I-70) and U.S. Route 40 (US-40) northeast of Ellsworth. Along the way, it intersects several major highways including US-50, US-83 and US-400 in Garden City; US-283 in Jetmore; and US-183 near Rozel, and it overlaps its implied parent, US-56, from Larned to east of Great Bend.

Before state highways were numbered in Kansas, there were auto trails; the section of K-156 from Larned to Great Bend followed the National Old Trails Road and Old Santa Fe Trail. By 1927, the section of K-156 from Garden City to Great Bend was established as US-50N. K-156 was originally US-156, an intrastate U.S. Highway that was formed in 1957, and ran from Garden City to Great Bend. Between 1966 and 1967, US-156 was extended northeast, along K-45, to I-70 northeast of Ellsworth. On April 1, 1981, US-156 was redesignated K-156.

Route description
K-156 begins at US-50 Bus. and US-83 Bus. in Garden City and runs in a generally northeast direction to I-70 and US-40 northeast of Ellsworth. K-156 is signed as east–west its entire length. According to 2018 traffic counts conducted by the Kansas Department of Transportation, on average, traffic varied from 1,080 vehicles per day slightly east of the Finney–Hodgeman county line to 14,500 vehicles per day in Great Bend, slightly west of US-281. The second highest volume of traffic was 11,500 vehicles per day, at the western terminus. The section of K-156 from the western end of the overlap with US-56 to its eastern terminus is included in the National Highway System. K-156 also connects to the National Highway System at its junction with US-50, US-83 and US-400 in Garden City.

All but  of K-156's  alignment is maintained by KDOT. The first  from the western terminus eastward is maintained by Garden City. The entire  section of K-156 in Larned and the entire  section of K-156 through Great Bend are maintained by the cities.

Finney and Hodgeman counties

The route begins in Garden City, on Kansas Avenue at the junction with US-50 Business and US-83 Business (Main Street). The highway continues over Kansas Avenue then turns northeast at a junction with Campus Drive. K-156 then intersects US-50, US-83 and US-400 via a diamond interchange and then continues to follows Kansas Avenue in a northeast direction out of the city. It then curves east at East 6 Mile Road, then intersects Mennonite Road  later. From here, the highway continues east for about  through rural farmlands before intersecting K-23, passing by Concannon State Fishing Lake and crossing Pawnee River along the way. Here K-156 begins a  overlap with K-23. At the end of the overlap K-23 turns south toward Cimarron, as K-156 continues east. K-156 then passes through Kalvesta, then curves to the northeast as it crosses into Hodgeman County. About  into the county, K-156 curves back to the east, then crosses Sand Creek  later. Roughly  further east the highway curves northeast for about  then curves back east. The highway continues another  then enters Jetmore. In Jetmore it intersects US-283, also known as Main Street. As it exits the city it travels a short distance then curves to the northeast at Bosse. The roadway then curves more to the northeast and passes to the north of Hanston. As it passes by Hanston, K-156 curves east briefly then back northeast as it begins to parallel a Kansas and Oklahoma Railroad track. About  later, the highway passes through Gray. It continues past Gray for another  then enters into Pawnee County.

Pawnee County

As it enters the county it continues to parallel a Kansas and Oklahoma Railroad track and the Pawnee River. After about  K-156 curves east, passes to the north of Rucker Airport, then enters the southern section of Burdett as Broadway Avenue. It exits the city and continues east, crosses Sawmill Creek, then reaches an intersection with Pawnee Street and 280th Avenue just south of Rozel. About  past Rozel it crosses a railroad track. From here the highway continues east through rural farmlands to US-183, crossing the Pawnee River and Cocklebur Creek along the way. It continues east for about  before intersecting K-264, passing Fort Larned National Historic Site along the way. K-264 heads south to Larned State Hospital, and K-156 continues east toward Larned. It enters Larned becoming Edwards Street then becomes 14th Street at an intersection with State Street. It continues along 14th Street and soon intersects its implied parent US-56, at Broadway Street. Here the two highways begin to overlap as they continue east. The two routes curve northeast as they exit the city and begin to parallel a Kansas and Oklahoma Railroad track. The highways then cross Ash Creek and enters Barton County  later.

Barton and Ellsworth counties

As K-156 enters the county it enters the city of Pawnee Rock. It continues northeast and soon passes Dundee. As it exits Dundee it passes to the south of Great Bend Municipal Airport. K-156 and US-56 then curve north and enter Great Bend as South Patton Road. The highways turn east at 10th Street then soon intersects and begins to overlap with K-96. After the three highways cross US-281, they leave Great Bend and  later, K-156 splits from US-56 and K-96, heading northeast from there. K-156 passes to the east of Cheyenne Bottoms Reservoir, crosses a Kansas and Oklahoma Railroad, then intersects K-4 at a folded diamond interchange east of Claflin. After an interchange with K-4, the highway enters Ellsworth County  later. The highway enters the county and continues northeast before entering Holyrood. As it exits the city, it continues through rural farm lands transitioning into grasslands, and soon intersects K-14 south of Ellsworth. At that junction, K-156 begins carrying a concurrency with K-14 Truck route. The two routes then cross the Smoky Hill River and a Union Pacific Railroad track then enter Ellsworth. Inside the city the two highways curve north at an intersection with 8th Street. The highway passes Memorial Cemetery and soon intersects K-140, known as East 15th Street westbound and Avenue J eastbound. Here, K-14 Truck splits from K-156 and follows K-140 westbound, and K-156 continues north. The highway soon exits the city and continues north for about  then curves northeast and crosses Oak Creek. K-156 then reaches a junction with K-111, crossing Spring Creek and East Spring Creek along the way. Past K-111, the landscape around the highway begins to transition to rolling hills covered by grasslands. K-156 then crosses and begins to parallel East Elkhorn Creek. It continues north along the creek for a few miles before reaching its northern terminus at exit 225 of I-70 and US-40 at a diamond interchange.

History

Before state highways were numbered in Kansas, there were auto trails, which were an informal network of marked routes that existed in the United States and Canada in the early part of the 20th century. From the western terminus, K-156 closely follows the former Old Santa Fe Trail, New Santa Fe Trail, National Old Trails Road and Albert Pike Highway. In Jetmore, K-156 intersects the former Star Highway. The highway then overlaps the National Old Trails Road and Old Santa Fe Trail from Larned to Great Bend. East of Claflin, the highway crosses the former Bee Line and Sunflower Trail, then crosses the former Golden Belt in Ellsworth.

By 1927, the section of modern K-156 from Garden City to Great Bend was established as US-50N. Between 1944 and 1945, the section of current K-156 between Holyrood to south of Ellsworth was established as a section of K-45. In the early 1950s, towns along what was then the K-45 corridor, connecting Ellsworth, Kansas to the Oklahoma state line at Elkhart, formed the Mid-Continent Diagonal Highway Association to push for a new highway from Springer, New Mexico (on US-85) northeast across the Oklahoma Panhandle, along K-45, and continuing to Manitowoc, Wisconsin on Lake Michigan. By mid-1954, it was being promoted as US-55 between the Great Lakes and the Southwestern United States. The first submissions to the American Association of State Highway Officials (AASHO) to establish the route were made in 1954. The first route considered in northeast Kansas was via US-40 from Ellsworth to Topeka and K-4 and US-59 via Atchison to St. Joseph, Missouri. A revised route adopted in March 1955, due to AASHO objections to the original route, which traveled concurrently with other U.S. highways for over half of its length, followed K-14, K-18, US-24, K-63, K-16, and US-59 via Lincoln and Manhattan. In July, the US 50N Association proposed a plan that would have eliminated US-50N by routing US-55 along most of its length, from Larned east to Baldwin Junction, and then along US-59 to Lawrence and K-10 to Kansas City; towns on US-50N west of Larned, which would have been bypassed, led a successful fight against this. However, in September of that year, the Kansas Highway Commission accepted that plan, taking US-55 east to Kansas City. On June 27, 1956, the AASHO Route Numbering Committee considered this refined plan for US-55, between Springer, New Mexico and Kansas City, Missouri, with a short US-155 along the remaining portion of US-50N from Larned west to Garden City. The committee approved the request, but since the proposed route was more east–west than north–south, it changed it to an even number – US 56 – and the spur to US-156.

Between 1962 and 1963, K-45 was extended southwest from Claflin to US-56 east of Great Bend. In a AASHO meeting on July 4–5, 1966, it was approved to extend US-156 from Larned northwest through Great Bend and Ellsworth to I-70. By 1967, US-156 had been extended northeast from Larned along US-56 to Great Bend, then along K-45 to I-70 northeast of Ellsworth. At this time the K-45 designation was removed. In a resolution on October 13, 1967, US-40 between I-70 north of Dorrance to I-70 north of Salina was realigned onto I-70. At this time K-111 was extended north to end at US-156. Between 1975 and 1980, a folded diamond interchange was constructed at the junction with K-4. In a December 17, 1980 resolution, US-50 and US-83 were moved to their current alignment in Garden City, and US-50 Business and US-83 Business became US-156's western terminus.

The entirety of US-156, from Garden City to I-70 northeast of Ellsworth, was decommissioned on April 1, 1981, and redesignated as K-156. In a May 3, 1996 resolution, US-400 was established from the Colorado border to K-156, then to the southern end of the overlap between US-83 and US-50 in Garden City. On July 6, 2020, work began on a project to add turning lanes at the interchange with Eighth Street in Ellsworth County. The $1.2 million project was completed by Venture Corporation of Great Bend.

Major intersections

References

External links

Kansas Department of Transportation State Map
KDOT: Historic State Maps
Historic endpoints of U.S. Highway 156

156
Transportation in Finney County, Kansas
Transportation in Hodgeman County, Kansas
Transportation in Pawnee County, Kansas
Transportation in Barton County, Kansas
Transportation in Ellsworth County, Kansas
U.S. Route 56